Burning Rain is the debut studio album by the hard rock band Burning Rain. It was released in 1999 on Pony Canyon.

Track listing
All songs written by Doug Aldrich and Keith St. John.

Personnel
Keith St. John – vocals
Doug Aldrich – guitars, producing, engineering
Ian Mayo – bass guitar
Alex Makarovich – drums

Production
Michael Scott - recording, engineering
David Hecht - engineering 
Jimmy Church - engineering
David Hecht - engineering
Jimmy Church - engineering
Darrel Thorp - assistant engineering
Noel Golden - mixing
Scott Guttierez - assistant engineering, mixing
Dave Donnelly - mastering

External links
Heavy Harmonies page
Burning Rain Official Website

Burning Rain albums
1999 debut albums